The Wisconsin Department of Veterans Affairs is a governmental agency of the U.S. state of Wisconsin that is responsible for veterans programs. The department is overseen by a secretary who is appointed by the governor after consulting with at least six Wisconsin veterans organizations. The secretary is advised by a nine-member citizen advisory Board of Veterans Affairs. The current Secretary is Mary M. Kolar.

History
In 1919, the state of Wisconsin issued a wartime bonus to service members who served in World War I. After World War II, the state legislature decided that instead of issuing a wartime bonus, they would create programs to provide a better benefit to the veterans. The Department of Veterans Affairs was created in 1945 to oversee these programs, which included:
The Grand Army Home (now Wisconsin Veterans Home) in King, Wisconsin
The Grand Army of the Republic Memorial in the state capitol
Economic and education assistance
The Veterans Trust Fund

In 1989, the state legislature authorized the Department of Veterans Affairs to build a new museum dedicated to Wisconsin veterans. The Wisconsin Veterans Museum opened across the street from the state capitol in 1993.

In 2001, the Department of Veterans Affairs opened a new veterans home at Union Grove, Wisconsin.

In 2013, the Department of Veterans Affairs opened a new veterans home at Chippewa Falls, Wisconsin at a cost of $20 million, with the ability to house 72 veterans.

State veteran cemeteries
The Department of Veterans Affairs maintains three veteran cemeteries:
Northern Wisconsin Veterans Memorial Cemetery is located near Spooner, Wisconsin. The cemetery was officially dedicated on June 10, 2001.
Central Wisconsin Veterans Memorial Cemetery is located at the Wisconsin Veterans Home at King. The cemetery was opened in 1888.
Southern Wisconsin Veterans Memorial Cemetery is located near Union Grove, Wisconsin. The cemetery was officially dedicated on May 31, 1998.

References

External links
Official website
Wisconsin Veterans Homes

Veterans Affairs